Fairmile Bottom is a  biological Site of Special Scientific Interest north-west of Arundel in West Sussex.

This is an area of scrub and mature woodland with scattered species-rich chalk grassland. Yew is dominant over much of the woods but in some parts there is a high proportion of beech. According to Natural England there is an "outstanding diversity of beetles" and butterflies include the white admiral and the uncommon silver-washed fritillary.

References

Local Nature Reserves in West Sussex 
Sites of Special Scientific Interest in West Sussex